Connaught Place is an area in the Bayswater area of the City of Westminster (a London Borough).  The nearest London Underground station to Connaught Place is Marble Arch which is a few minutes to the East near Marble Arch walking past the site of the Tyburn Tree.

Located at the edge of Hyde Park, Connaught Place is framed by Edgware Road, Bayswater Road, Seymore Street and Stanhope Place.  The head offices of the Premier League and Experian are located here, as is the Matlock Bank, Mayfair Conference Centre, The Victory Services Club, and various companies

A blue plaque at number 2 records the residence there of Lord Randolph Churchill from 1883 to 1892. Idina Sackville was living in Connaught Place in 1914.

References

Streets in the City of Westminster